Ulladulla High School is a government-funded co-educational comprehensive secondary day school, located in the town of Ulladulla on the south-east coast of New South Wales, Australia.

Established in 1974, the school enrolled approximately 1,200 students in 2018, from Year 7 to Year 12, of whom seven percent identified as Indigenous Australians and seven percent were from a language background other than English. The school is operated by the NSW Department of Education; the principal is Denise Lofts.

History

Ulladulla High School was opened in 1974. Since the opening of UHS, the school has undergone construction and renovation, most notably starting in 2006. This construction included new creative arts and music rooms, a kiln room, a blue room, a darkroom, several art store rooms, a sound proof band room, a sound proof piano room, and several music store rooms.

As of late 2011, the school has commenced its largest contraction project since 2006, with the commencement of the new Multi Purpose Hall which will seat in excess of 800 audience members internally, as well as several hundred more in the adjoining COLA.

Principals

Academic performance
The school's NAPLAN results are generally below the Australian average, but typically above the averages achieved by schools of a similar demographic.

Controversies

In 2012, there were numerous complaints by members of the community about students loitering in the CBD during school hours, drinking, smoking, swearing and harassing shoppers. This later sparked controversy and has called for the encouragement and support of the local community to not serve students unless they are in possession of a valid leave pass. The initiative 'you need the student pass' was implemented as of 5 June 2012.

In 2011 Ulladulla High School faced criticism over its management of Special Religious Education. The then principal, Tracy Provest, was criticised by some parents for requiring non-religious students to attend scripture lessons to acquire 'non-scripture' notes, and providing minimal supervision for those 'opting out'.

In 2009, Ulladulla High School was featured in the media for allowing the Christian-affiliated Organisation, Choices, Decisions, Outcomes to provide sex education classes to students.

In 2006, the Principal, Tracy Provest, allowed students to be breathalysed at school socials, despite this being against Departmental guidelines.

Notable alumni
 Matt Best - drummer in the band Tonight Alive signed to both Fearless Records and Sony Music Entertainment Australia
 Jihad Dib - former teacher at the school who later became a politician
 Luke O'Donnell - former professional rugby league footballer
 Gary Warburton - professional rugby league player with the Canterbury-Bankstown Bulldogs

See also 

 List of government schools in New South Wales
 List of schools in Illawarra and the South East (New South Wales)
 Education in Australia

References

External links
 

South Coast (New South Wales)
Public high schools in New South Wales
1974 establishments in Australia
Educational institutions established in 1974